Plop: The Hairless Elbonian is an experimental spinoff of the Dilbert comic strip, both by Scott Adams. It follows the life of the titular Elbonian who, having absolutely no hair, is unusual in his country. Twenty-eight comics were published in 2001 but none have been seen since, mainly because they were produced in the summer of 2001; Adams was doubtful about making a comic about "people who look like the Taliban" in the wake of 9/11, so the project was shelved "probably permanently" according to Adams.

Plop was so named because, according to Adams, that was "the first thing my mom heard when I was born three months prematurely." From strip #21, Plop starts to rename himself "Squat", after his name certificate misspells "Scott". According to the Dilbert newsletter, the background reason for this name-change was that Plop had been the name of a comic book in the past.

References 

Comics spin-offs
2001 comics debuts
2001 comics endings
Gag-a-day comics
Dilbert
Male characters in comics